Wainwright/Wainwright (Field 21) Airport , formerly CFP7, is located  west of Wainwright, Alberta, Canada. The airfield which is owned by the Department of National Defence forms part of CFB Wainwright.

References

Military airbases in Alberta
Municipal District of Wainwright No. 61